Nanorana feae (common names: Kakhien paa frog, ocellated spiny frog) is a species of frog in the family Dicroglossidae.
It is found in Yunnan, China, and the Kachin Hills in Myanmar. The specific name feae honors Leonardo Fea, an Italian explorer, zoologist, and naturalist. This little-known species probably inhabits hill streams in forested areas.

References

feae
Amphibians of Myanmar
Amphibians of China
Taxonomy articles created by Polbot
Amphibians described in 1887